Marc Anthony is the first English album and fourth studio album overall by American singer Marc Anthony. It was released on September 14, 1999 by Columbia. The album debuted in the top 10 on the US Billboard 200 and has since gone 3× Platinum in the United States. This was Anthony's first English album since his 1991 effort, When the Night Is Over, in which he recorded with Little Louie Vega. It sold more than 4 million copies worldwide.

Track listing

Charts

Weekly charts

Year-end charts

Sales and certifications

References 

Marc Anthony albums
1999 albums
Columbia Records albums
Albums produced by Cory Rooney